The canton of Meaux-Sud is a French former administrative division, located in the arrondissement of Meaux, in the Seine-et-Marne département (Île-de-France région). It was disbanded following the French canton reorganisation which came into effect in March 2015.

Demographics

Composition 
The canton of Meaux-Sud was composed of 10 communes:

Fublaines
Isles-lès-Villenoy
Mareuil-lès-Meaux
Meaux (partly)
Montceaux-lès-Meaux
Nanteuil-lès-Meaux
Trilbardou
Trilport
Vignely
Villenoy

See also
Cantons of the Seine-et-Marne department
Communes of the Seine-et-Marne department

References

Meaux Sud
2015 disestablishments in France
States and territories disestablished in 2015